The Licensing of the Press Act 1662 was an Act of the Parliament of England (14 Cha. 2. c. 33) with the long title "An Act for preventing the frequent Abuses in printing seditious treasonable and unlicensed Books and Pamphlets and for regulating of Printing and Printing Presses". Having expired in 1695, it was officially repealed by the Statute Law Revision Act 1863, which repealed a large set of superseded acts.

The Act was originally limited to two years. The provisions as to importation of books, the appointment of licensers, and the number of printers and founders were practically re-enactments of the similar provisions in an order of the Star Chamber of 1637.

Printing presses were not to be set up without notice to the Stationers' Company. A king's messenger had power by warrant of the king or a secretary of state to enter and search for unlicensed presses and printing. Severe penalties by fine and imprisonment were denounced against offenders. The act was successively renewed up to 1679.

Under the powers of the act Sir Roger L'Estrange was appointed licenser, and the effect of the supervision was that practically the newspaper press was reduced to the London Gazette. The objections  made to lines 594–599 of the first book of Paradise Lost by the archbishop of Canterbury's chaplain, acting as licenser, are well known. The act expired in 1679, and for the remainder of the reign of Charles II, as in the reign of George III, the restrictions on the press took the form of prosecutions for libel.

In 1685 the Licensing Act was renewed for seven years (1 Ja. 2. c. 17, s. 15). No mention of the liberty of the press was made in the Bill of Rights. On the expiration of the Licensing Act in 1692 it was continued till the end of the existing session of parliament (4 & 5 Will. and Mar., c. 24, s. 14). In 1695 the Commons refused to renew it. The stationers petitioned Parliament for new censorship legislation, and when that failed they argued that authors had a natural and inherent right of ownership in what they wrote (knowing there was little an author could do with such rights other than sign them over to a publisher). This argument persuaded the Parliament and in 1710 the first Copyright Act (8 Ann. c. 19) was enacted.

The power of a secretary of state to issue a warrant, whether general or special, for the purpose of searching for and seizing the author of a libel or the libellous papers themselves – a power exercised by the Star Chamber and confirmed by the Licensing Act – was still asserted, and was not finally declared illegal until the case of Entick v. Carrington in 1765 (St. Tr. xix. 1030). In 1776 the House of Commons came to a resolution in accordance with this decision. The compulsory stamp duty on newspapers was abandoned in 1855 (18 Vict. c. 27), the duty on paper in 1861 (24 Vict. C. 20), the optional duty on newspapers in 1870 (33 & 34 Vict. c. 38). From that time the English press may be said to date its complete freedom, which rests rather upon an oral constitutional rather than a statutory foundation.  No legislative provision confirms the freedom of the press, as is the case in many countries.

See also
 Freedom of the press
 Lapse of the Licensing Act, 1695
 Licensing Order of 1643
 Statute of Anne, 1710
United Kingdom constitutional law

References

'Charles II, 1662: An Act for preventing the frequent Abuses in printing seditious treasonable and unlicensed Bookes and Pamphlets and for regulating of Printing and Printing Presses.', Statutes of the Realm: volume 5: 1628–80 (1819), pp. 428–35. URL: http://www.british-history.ac.uk/report.asp?compid=47336. Date accessed: 5 March 2007.

Acts of the Parliament of England
1662 in England
1662 in law